Your Game...Live at the 9:30 Club is a live-tribute album released on May 15, 2001 by the Washington, D.C.-based go-go musician Chuck Brown. The album was recorded live at The 9:30 Club in Washington, D.C. The live performance was a collaboration between Chuck Brown and some of the musicians who were influenced by his works.  The album consists of go-go renditions of classic neo soul, go-go, jazz and blues songs.

Track listing

Personnel
 Chuck Brown – lead vocals, electric guitar
 John M. Buchannan – keyboards, trombone
 Leroy Fleming – tenor saxophone, background vocals
 Curtis Johnson – keyboards
 Donald Tillery – trumpet, background vocals
 Ricardo D. Wellman – drums
 Rowland Smith – congas, background vocals
 Glenn Ellis – bass guitar, percussions

References

External links
Your Game...Live at the 9:30 Club at Discogs.com

2001 live albums
Chuck Brown albums
Live rhythm and blues albums
Tribute albums